Eva Erin Igo (born November 9, 2002), is an American dancer and actress from Saint Paul, Minnesota.  She made her debut as a dancer on NBC's World of Dance season 1 by taking second place after Les Twins.

Some of her past dancing has been criticized for gravitating more towards gymnastics rather than dance. In response, Eva claims that dance comes in all manners.

Personal life 
Eva Igo was born and raised in Saint Paul, Minnesota. She dances at Larkin Dance Studio in Maplewood, Minnesota.

Career 
At the age of fourteen, Igo was a contestant on the first season of NBC's World of Dance in 2017. She came in second to Les Twins by .1 point. She came first in the Junior Division. Later, she returned in Season 2.

After performing on World of Dance, she performed in the United States and Canada with World of Dance LIVE Tour in 2017. She also performed at Vidcon 2018.

Igo was also featured in Jennifer Lopez's music video, "Amor, Amor, Amor" directed by Jessy Terrero.

She won the Industry Dance Awards for "Most Fierce Dancer Under 18". She was nominated along industry elites Charlize Glass, JT Church, Sean Lew and Kaycee Rice. Igo was also nominated for a People's Choice Award as the "Competition Contestant of 2018".

In 2019, Igo guest-starred on Dance+5 India in Mumbai.

Igo worked with Welling Films in the AXI: Avengers of Xtreme Illusions, alongside actors/dancers Preslee Bishop, Chloe Klitus, and Darrin Dewitt Henson. She made her premier feature in film with director, Shawn Welling, in his film, The Last Astronaut in 2018. She won "Rising Star" at WorldFest Houston in 2019 for her work in The Last Astronaut as Evena.

Trivia 
  Igo appeared in season 3 episode 11 of the reality show Dance Moms, entitled Camouflaged Maneuvers. She and her team placed 1st against the ALDC's "Don't Ask Just Tell," and Igo placed 1st to Maddie Ziegler and received the highest score in the competition.

Igo received a perfect score with her solo "River" at Hall of Fame Dance Challenge in St. Paul, Minnesota in 2017. She is the first solo dancer to do so in over 12 years.

References 

2002 births
Living people
American female dancers
Dancers from Minnesota
21st-century American women